Khurshed Hasanov (born 19 August 1973) is a Tajikistani boxer. He competed in the men's bantamweight event at the 1996 Summer Olympics.

References

External links

1973 births
Living people
Tajikistani male boxers
Olympic boxers of Tajikistan
Boxers at the 1996 Summer Olympics
Place of birth missing (living people)
Bantamweight boxers